Bouillon can refer to:

Food
 Bouillon (broth), a simple broth
 Court-bouillon, a quick broth
 Bouillon (soup), a Haitian soup
 Bouillon (restaurant),  a traditional type of French restaurant
Bouillon Chartier, a bouillon restaurant founded in 1896
 Bouillon (grape), another name for the French wine grape Folle Blanche
 Bouillon cube, used in cooking, especially in soups

People
 Cardinal de Bouillon, French prelate and diplomat born Emmanuel Théodose de La Tour d'Auvergne (1643–1715)
 Christophe Bouillon (born 1969), member of the National Assembly of France
 Duchess of Bouillon, a French title since the 10th century
 Francis Bouillon, a defenseman for the Montreal Canadiens hockey team
 Godfrey de Bouillon, a Lord of Bouillon and a leader of the First Crusade
 Jean Bouillon (1926–2009), Belgian marine biologist
 Jean-Claude Bouillon (1941–2017), French actor
 Klaus Bouillon (born 1947), German politician
 Lords of Bouillon, French titles during the Middle Ages in Lower Lorraine
 Marc Bouillon (born 1968), Belgian cyclist
 Sophie Bouillon (born 1984), French journalist

Places
 Bouillon, Belgium, a town in Belgium
Bouillon Castle, a medieval castle in Belgium
Duchy of Bouillon, a domain that existed between 1291 and 1806
Republic of Bouillon, a short-lived successor to the Duchy of Bouillon
 Bouillon, Pyrénées-Atlantiques, a commune in southwestern France
 Le Bouillon, a commune in northwestern France

Other
 Bouillon de culture, a French television show